The 1861 Napier by-election was a by-election held in the  electorate during the 3rd New Zealand Parliament, on 1 July 1861.

The by-election was caused by the resignation of incumbent MP Henry Stark and was won by William Colenso. Messrs Colenso, Sealy, Tucker and Ferguson were nominated, with Colenso subsequently elected with a majority of 17.

Results

References

Napier 1861
1861 elections in New Zealand
July 1861 events
Politics of the Hawke's Bay Region